William or Bill Patterson may refer to:

Politics 
 William Patterson (New York politician) (1789–1838), U.S. Representative from New York
 William Patterson (Ohio politician) (1790–1868), U.S. Representative from Ohio
 William Albert Patterson (1841–1917), Canadian Member of Parliament
 William John Patterson (1886–1976), Canadian Premier of Saskatchewan
 William G. Patterson (1923–2000), politician in Newfoundland, Canada
 William L. Patterson (1891–1980), American civil rights activist; US Communist Party leader
 R. William Patterson (1908–1994), American politician; former mayor of Dayton, Ohio
 William Patterson (Alberta politician) (1908–1996), Alberta MLA, 1959–1967
 William Worth Patterson (1849–1921), mayor of Ashland, Kentucky

Sport 
 Bill Patterson (footballer, born 1888) (1888–1956), former Australian rules footballer for St Kilda
 Bill Patterson (footballer, born 1873) (1873–1939), former Australian rules footballer for Carlton
 Billy Patterson (1918–1998), American football player for the Chicago Cardinals and Pittsburgh Pirates
 Bill Patterson (racing driver) (1923–2010), Australian motor racing driver
 Bill Patterson (rugby union) (1936–1999), English rugby union player
 William Patterson (cricketer, born 1854) (1854–1939), English amateur cricketer
 William Patterson (cricketer, born 1859) (1859–1946), English amateur cricketer
 Will Patterson (born 1987), American football linebacker

Others 
 William Patterson (engineer) (1795–1869), 19th century engineer and boat builder
 William Hammond Patterson (1847–1896), British trade unionist
 William Patrick Patterson, author and spiritual teacher of The Fourth Way
 William A. Patterson (1899–1980), president of United Airlines from 1934 until 1966
 William R. Patterson (born 1975), American motivational speaker
 William Patterson, author of subjects and dialogues for the comic strip Jeff Hawke
 William Patterson (priest) (1930–2002), Anglican priest
 William Patterson (Maryland businessman) (1752–1835), businessman and a founder of the Baltimore and Ohio Railroad
 William James Patterson (1838–1926), Commander-in-Chief of the Grand Army of the Republic
 William Burns Paterson (1850–1915), educator and horticulturist
 Spaceman Patterson (William Patterson), composer, arranger and producer

See also
 Willie Patterson (disambiguation)
 William Paterson (disambiguation)
 William Pattison (disambiguation)